Neil E. Schore is an American chemist and former associate professor of organic chemistry and Vice Chair of Chemistry at the University of California, Davis. He is also the co-author of Organic Chemistry: Structure and Function. His research areas include “mechanistic and synthetic organic and organometallic chemistry; applications of organometallic chemistry and polymer chemistry to organic synthesis.” He is now a Professor Emeritus at UC Davis and holds the position of Adjunct Professor at the Korea University International Summer Campus, teaching both general chemistry and organic chemistry.

Honors, awards, and professional highlights 
Source:

 2019 Appointed as Professor Emeritus of Chemistry, UC Davis
 2012 Appointed to faculty, Korea University International Summer Campus
 2006 Phi Beta Kappa Award for Teaching Excellence 
 1999 Vice Chair of Chemistry, UC Davis
 1999 Executive Secretary, UC Cancer Research Coordinating Committee
 1989 Distinguished Teaching Award
 1982 Became an Associate Professor, UC Davis
 1981-1985 Dreyfus Teacher-Scholar
 1979 Magnar Ronning Award, Teaching Excellence
 1976 Appointed to faculty, UC Davis (Assistant Professor)
 1974-1976 NIH Postdoctoral Fellowship
 1973 Ph.D. Columbia University
 1973 Louis P. Hammett Award 
 1969-1973 NSF and NIH Predoctoral fellowships
 1969 B.A. University of Pennsylvania

References

External links
Faculty entry at the Department of Chemistry, University of California, Davis (UCD)

Living people
21st-century American chemists
Organic chemists
University of California, Davis faculty
1948 births